William Hutchison (1820 – 3 December 1905) was a New Zealand politician and journalist.  Hutchison and his son George were both Members of Parliament.

Early life
Hutchison was born in Banffshire, Scotland, and trained as a journalist.  On 12 August 1846, he married Helen Hutchison (née Aicheson) of Inverness. They emigrated to New Zealand in 1866 for him to take up employment with The Southern Cross.

Life in New Zealand

A journalist, Hutchison worked for The Southern Cross in Auckland for some months, then bought the Wanganui Chronicle and started the Tribune in Wellington.

He was Mayor of Wanganui, New Zealand from 1873 to 1874.  Then he was Mayor of Wellington from 1876 to 1877, and from 1879 to 1881. As Mayor of Wellington, a central issue was whether the Wellington Waterfront should be controlled by the city council or a separate entity.

He was a member of the Wellington Provincial Council from 1867 to 1876 for the Wanganui electorate.

He stood in the 1875 election in the  electorate and was decisively beaten by the incumbent, William Fitzherbert. He moved to Dunedin in 1884.

He then stood for the Roslyn electorate in the 1887 general election. Following the death of Henry Fish, he contested the resulting . Alexander Sligo, Hugh Gourley and Hutchison received 5045, 4065 and 2030 votes, respectively. He was a supporter of the Liberal Party.

His son George Hutchison represented Taranaki electorates in Parliament. For six years (from 1890 to 1896) they were in Parliament at the same time,  and were often seen glaring at each other from opposite sides of the house.

Another son, Sir James Hutchison, was editor of the Otago Daily Times.

Death
Hutchison's wife died five years before him.  He had been ill for some time before he died on 3 December 1905 at his home in Queen Street, Dunedin. He was survived by four sons and four daughters.

Hutchison Road in Wellington was named in his honour.

Notes

References

No Mean City by Stuart Perry (1969, Wellington City Council) includes a paragraph and a portrait or photo for each mayor.

1820 births
1905 deaths
Mayors of Wellington
Wellington City Councillors
Members of the New Zealand House of Representatives
Members of the Wellington Provincial Council
Scottish emigrants to New Zealand
Mayors of Wanganui
New Zealand MPs for Dunedin electorates
Unsuccessful candidates in the 1884 New Zealand general election
Unsuccessful candidates in the 1887 New Zealand general election
Unsuccessful candidates in the 1896 New Zealand general election
People from Banffshire
19th-century New Zealand politicians